Matthew (Matt) Edwards (born 4 June 1975) is an English electronic music producer and DJ based in Berlin, Germany. He is best known for his work in house and techno that he produces under his Radio Slave moniker. He has also released under a variety of different aliases including Cabin Fever, Canvas, DJ Maxxi, The Machine, REKID, Seadevils and Quiet Village. He is also co-founder of London-based record label Rekids, which he formed in 2006 with James Masters. Rekids is also mother label to the REK'D and Pyramids of Mars imprints.

Career
Edwards' career began as a DJ in London and Aberystwyth, where he picked up a residency at the Milk Bar in 1992 and Aberystwyth football club. He would then go on to become resident at the legendary Ministry of Sound. He has since gone on to DJ all over the world, visiting virtually every major club, including Fabric (London), Cocoon (Frankfurt), Womb (Tokyo), Space (Ibiza), Robert Johnson (Frankfurt), The Arches (Glasgow), Trouw (Amsterdam) Spank (Aberystwyth football club) and many more. Edwards is consistently touring throughout the year and currently holds residencies at Berlin's Panorama Bar and Paris' Rex Club with the Rekids club nights.

Radio Slave began in 2000 as a duo remixing project with Serge Santiago. As a pair Matt and Serge produced bootleg club remixes of songs by Busta Rhymes, Kylie Minogue, Limp Bizkit, Nancy Sinatra and many more pop artists. Around 2002, Serge left to pursue his own musical path leaving Edwards in control of the Radio Slave guise. He continued to produce a string of remixes for well-established artists, before finally releasing his own original material in 2006. From this point onwards, Edwards continued to release his own music, mostly through his own label Rekids, as well as remixing more underground electronic artists. In recent years, he has also released a number of different mix CDs including Fabric 48 and Strictly Rhythm Vol. 5.

As Radio Slave, Edwards is yet to release a full-length LP. However he has released albums of original material as The Machine, REKID and Quiet Village (with Joel Martin). The Machine is a multi-media venture combining music and visuals. The aural aspect features 6 tracks of experimental soundscapes – using found sounds and taking influence from contemporary electro-acoustic composition. The visual aspect comprises a short film by UK artists Lovely Jon & Mike Keelin, and each track has a corresponding image designed by Australian pop artist Misha Hollenbach. The music is available on CD and vinyl as The Machine's LP 'RedHead' and was released in 2010. The second track Opening Ceremony (Fuse) also appeared on Berlin imprint Innervisions in 2009 remixed by Ame and Dixon.
As Quiet Village, Edwards released full-length LP 'Silent Movie' on Studio !K7 in 2008. The album was released on both vinyl and CD and focusses on more downtempo, left field music with balearic influences. As REKID, Matt released 14-track album 'Made in Menorca' in 2006 on Soul Jazz Records. The album was released on vinyl as well as CD and takes influence from disco music and deep house.

In 2011 he collaborated with Japanese toy maker Devilrobots to create a Rekids-themed toy 'No Sleep No Tofu'. The toy is a Japanese Kubrick figure produced by MediCom – a small, limited edition collector's item with a block-style human form similar to Playmobil or Lego. The head of the figure is a detachable block which features the sleeve design for REKIDS036 – Radio Slave – No Sleep (Part Six).

In May 2012, Edwards released a sample pack with label Sample Magic. The pack features 500MB of percussive and musical loops, hits and effects, designed to be used as tools for electronic music producers. 2012 also saw the launch the 'Pyramids of Mars' label – a multimedia project that incorporates various strands of artistic disciplines. The 2010 album RedHead (under his 'Machine' pseudonym) was re-issued on Pyramids of Mars as part of a deluxe package, including a re-interpretation of the full album by Joe Claussell. The boxset was limited to 50 copies, each hand-painted by Misha Hollenbach, and included triple-vinyl pressings of both Claussell's and Edwards' versions. The release was available exclusively at London's LN-CC store.

Selected discography

Albums 
 REKID: Made In Menorca, 2006
 Quiet Village: Silent Movie, 2008
 The Machine: RedHead, 2010
 Radio Slave: "Works! Selected Remixes 2006 -2010", 2011

Singles
 Radio Slave: Untitled, 2004
 Radio Slave: Slow, 2004
 Radio Slave: I'm Really Hot, 2004
 Radio Slave: Red Light, Green Light, 2004
 Radio Slave: Presents High Concept, 2004
 Radio Slave: My Bleep, 2006
 Radio Slave: No Sleep (Part One), 2006
 Radio Slave: No Sleep (Part Two), 2006
 Radio Slave: Secret Base, 2006
 Radio Slave: Bell Clap Dance, 2007
 Radio Slave: Screaming Hands (Remixes), 2007
 Radio Slave: No Sleep (Part Three), 2007
 Radio Slave: No Sleep (Part Four), 2008
 Radio Slave: No Sleep (Part Five), 2008
 Radio Slave: Sex Trax EP, 2008
 Radio Slave feat. Danton Eeprom: Grindhouse (Remixes), 2008
 Radio Slave: Bell Clap Dance (Remixes), 2008
 Radio Slave: Tantakatan (The Drunken Shed Mix), 2008
 Radio Slave: Eyes Wide Open / Incognito, 2008
 Radio Slave / Tony Lionni: Berghain 03 / Part 1, 2009
 Radio Slave: No Sleep (Part Six), 2009
 Radio Slave: No Sleep (Part Six Remixes), 2009
 Radio Slave: I Don't Need A Cure For This, 2010
 Radio Slave: I Don't Need A Cure For This (Remixes), 2010
 Radio Slave: East West EP, 2010
 Radio Slave: "Absolute Absolute", 2011
 Radio Slave: "Live Edits", 2012

Selected remixes
 Peace Division Feat. Pleasant Gehman: Blacklight Sleaze, 2006
 Matt O'Brien: Serotone, 2006
 Armand Van Helden: This Ain't Hollywood, 2007
 Len Faki: My Black Sheep, 2007
 UNKLE: Burn My Shadow, 2007
 Trentemøller: Moan, 2007
 Tiefschwarz: Blow, 2007
 Slam: Azure, 2007
 Discemi: Data Sapiens, 2007
 X-Press 2: Call That Love, 2008
 Mlle Caro & Franck Garcia: Dead Souls, 2008
 Booka Shade: Sweet Lies, 2008
 Florian Meindl: 8 Bit Romance, 2008
 Mr. G: Makes No Sense, 2008
 Humate: Love Stimulation, 2009
 Hell Feat. P Diddy: The DJ, 2009
 Dubfire: Rabid, 2009
 Steve Lawler: Hocus Pocus, 2009
 Dance Disorder: My Time, 2009
 Josh Wink: Stay Out All Night, 2010
 Simon Baker: Too Slow, 2010
 DJ Sneak: Southern Boy, 2010
 Paul Harris & Alex Tepper: Terris, 2010
 M.A.N.D.E.A.R: Buddies, 2011
 Agoria Feat. Carl Craig & La Scalars: Speechless, 2011
 Mousse T: Horny, 2011
 DJ Sodeyama: Life, 2011
 Midland: Bring Joy, 2011
 Slam: "Eterna", 2011
 Intruder feat. Jei: "Amame", 2012
 DJ W!LD feat. Hector Moralez: "Take A Trip", 2012

DJ mix compilations 
 Radio Slave: Radio Slave Presents Creature Of The Night, 2006 (DJ mix album)
 Radio Slave: REKIDS Mixed By Radio Slave, 2007 (DJ mix album)
 Radio Slave: Misch Masch, 2007 (DJ mix album)
 Boris Dlugosch vs. Radio Slave: Radio Disco, 2007 (DJ mix album)
 Radio Slave: Fabric 48, 2009 (DJ mix album)
 Radio Slave: Radio Slave Presents Strictly Rhythm Vol. 5, 2010 (DJ mix album)
 Radio Slave: Slave To The Rhythm, 2011 (DJ mix album, produced with Mixmag)

References

External links 
 Matt Edwards' Rekids record label site
 Radio Slave's discography at Discogs

Living people
British electronic musicians
English techno musicians
English DJs
Musicians from Brighton and Hove
Remixers
1970 births
Electronic dance music DJs